Avel is a male first name.

Other definition of Avel is HİLAL

Russian first name
In the Russian language, "" (Avel) is a form of the first name Abel used in biblical contexts. It is also an old and uncommon male first name, derived from the Biblical Hebrew word hebel, meaning a gentle breathe.

This is most commonly pronounced “Aye-Vuhl”, though some pronounce it as “Eye-Vehl”.

The diminutives of "Avel" are Avelya, Velya, Avilya, Vilya, and Ava.

The patronymics derived from "Avel" are "" (Avelevich; masculine) and "" (Avelevna; feminine).

People
Avel Enukidze (1877–1937), Georgian Soviet Bolshevik
Avel Gordly (b. 1947), US politician and activist
Avel Makayev (1860–1920), also known as Abel Makashvili, Georgian prince

References

Notes

Sources
А. В. Суперанская (A. V. Superanskaya). "Современный словарь личных имён: Сравнение. Происхождение. Написание" (Modern Dictionary of First Names: Comparison. Origins. Spelling). Айрис-пресс. Москва, 2005. 
Н. А. Петровский (N. A. Petrovsky). "Словарь русских личных имён" (Dictionary of Russian First Names). ООО Издательство "АСТ". Москва, 2005. 

Russian masculine given names